Yelavarthy Nayudamma (10 September 1922 – 23 June 1985) was a chemical engineer and a scientist killed on Air India Flight 182 (Emperor Kanishka bombing).

Early life and education

Nayudamma was born on 10 September 1922 into an agricultural family at Yelavarru village near Tenali in Guntur district of present day Andhra Pradesh state in India. He was the eldest of three brothers and a sister. His parents Raghavamma and Anjaih named him Nayudammma (‘amma’ is a short name used by parents while referring to sons as well as daughters, while ‘Nayudu’ in Telugu means a leader). Nayudamma who was over 6 feet tall lived up to his name.

He had his primary education in the village and studied Intermediate in AC College. Later, he did B.SC (Chemical Technology) at the famous Banaras Hindu University and a course in leather technology at Madras Institute of Leather Technology. He contributed to the initial development of the Central Leather Research Institute at Chennai, India. He was responsible for building the international image of the institute and for establishing close ties with the Indian leather industry.

Positions and honors 
Nayudamma served as the Director General of CSIR, New Delhi and also as the 4th Vice-Chancellor of the prestigious Jawaharlal Nehru University in New Delhi from 12 June 1981 to 27 October 1982. He also served on many prestigious national and international committees.

He was awarded many national and international awards and honours, including Padma Shri in 1971.

Yelevarthy was conferred with the prestigious Raja-Lakshmi Award in the year 1983 from Sri Raja-Lakshmi Foundation, Chennai.

Death
Dr Nayudamma left India on June 10, 1985, to attend COSTED meeting in USSR and then the International Development Research Centre Governors meeting on June 21 in Ottawa, Canada. On June 23 he boarded Air India Flight 182 titled ‘Emperor Kanishka’ carrying 329 passengers. He died in mid-air bombing by Sikh extremist group over the waters of the Atlantic Ocean, South of Ireland.

He was married to Y. Pavana. His had two sons, Rathiesh and Ramesh, and one daughter Shanti. After Yelevarthy's death, his wife committed suicide.

Dr. Y. Nayudamma Memorial Award
Recipients of this prestigious award include T. Ramasami, A. Sivathanu Pillai, Nori Dattatreyudu, Sam Pitroda, G. Madhavan Nair, Kota Harinarayana, V. K. Aatre, R. Chidambaram, R.A. Mashelkar, Jasbir Singh Bajaj, K. Kasturirangan, Verghese Kurien, S.Z. Qasim, M. G. K. Menon,  Vijay Kumar Saraswat and M.S. Swaminathan among others.

References

Telugu people
1922 births
1985 deaths
Recipients of the Padma Shri in trade and industry
Banaras Hindu University alumni
People from Guntur district
Academic staff of Jawaharlal Nehru University
Air India Flight 182
Scientists from Andhra Pradesh
Indian chemical engineers
Mass murder victims
Victims of aviation accidents or incidents in Ireland
Indian people murdered abroad
People murdered in Ireland
Indian leather industry
20th-century Indian chemists
Terrorism victims in India
Victims of Sikh terrorism
Victims of aviation accidents or incidents in 1985